Texas State Highway 220 (SH 220) is a Texas state highway located in Hamilton and Erath Counties.

Route description
SH 220 begins at an intersection with SH 6 in Hico. The route travels generally to the northeast, and the only highway intersection between its termini is with  FM 2481, approximately four miles north of Hico. SH 220 ends at an intersection with  US 67 west of Chalk Mountain.

History
SH 220 was designated on May 28, 1935 from Hico to Bluff Dale, but was not numbered until June 1935 (designated before SH 219). On July 15, 1935, SH 220 was cancelled. On August 1, 1936, SH 220 was restored. On August 1, 1938, SH 220 was moved to its current route.

Major intersections

See also

 List of state highways in Texas
 List of highways numbered 220

References

External links

220
Transportation in Hamilton County, Texas
Transportation in Erath County, Texas